Lansdowne House is a 9-storey office block in Dublin, Republic of Ireland.

History
Lansdowne House was completed in 1967, and is situated on the corner of Lansdowne Road and Northumberland Road in Ballsbridge, opposite the Ballsbridge Hotel, previously a Jurys Hotel. It was built by Hardwicke Ltd, and designed by Brian Hogan. It was initially built as the headquarters of Allied Irish Bank, on a site that had been occupied by a number of Victorian houses. The then Minister for Finance, Charles Haughey, officially opened the building in November 1967.

Upon its completion, the Office of Public Works took out a 65-year lease on the top 8 floors. The ground floor was occupied by a branch of Allied Irish Bank. IDA Ireland also rented space in the building for a period of time.

It was the first building in Dublin to be constructed using pre-cast units made on the site by the construction firm G&T Crampton. It was also the first building in Dublin to have drained and load-bearing pre-cast facade.

The building was sold in 1996 for £9 million. The building was refurbished in the 2010s, and is occupied by the Labour Court and Workplace Relations Commission.

See also
Setanta Centre

References

Office buildings in the Republic of Ireland
Office buildings completed in 1967
Buildings and structures in Dublin (city)
1967 establishments in Ireland
Allied Irish Banks
Brutalist architecture in Ireland
20th-century architecture in the Republic of Ireland